The Best So Far is a greatest hits compilation album by R&B singer Toni Braxton released exclusively in Brazil.

The track list contains Braxton most successful singles, such as "How Could an Angel Break My Heart", "Breathe Again", "You're Makin Me High", "He Wasn't Man Enough", "You Mean the World to Me" and a few different tracks as the duet with Il Divo, "The Time of Our Lives" and "Why Should I Care".

The album was released at the same time Braxton's album The Essential Toni Braxton was released around the world. All songs present in "The Best So Far" are included in "The Essential" with the exception of "Spanish Guitar" which is the "Royal Garden" remix not the album version.

The album "The Essential Toni Braxton" was never released in Brazil. The track list for the Brazilian version was composed with the songs from the compilation,

Reception
The album was a success in Brazil, reaching a gold status for selling over 30,000 copies, and later receiving a platinum certification, for selling over 60,000 copies.

Track listing
Source:

Charts and certifications

Weekly charts

Certifications and sales

References

Toni Braxton compilation albums
Albums produced by David Foster
Albums produced by the Neptunes
Albums produced by R. Kelly
2007 greatest hits albums
Som Livre compilation albums